Dhanauji  is a rural municipality in Dhanusha District in Province No. 2 of south-eastern Nepal established in 2073. As of 2011 Nepal census, it has a population of 22,395. It was formed by joining Jhojhi Kataiya, Lakhauri, Bahuarba and former Dhanuji Village development committees. The total area of Nagarain municipality is 22 km2.

See also 

 Bimalendra Nidhi
 Ram Saroj Yadav
(Sandip pandit) Bahuarwa))

External links

UN map of the municipalities of Dhanusa District

References

Populated places in Dhanusha District
Rural municipalities of Nepal established in 2017
Rural municipalities in Madhesh Province